Sergey Viktorovich Chemezov (born 20 August 1952) is the CEO of Rostec Corporation, a state-owned defense conglomorate. A former KGB agent and high-ranking general, Chemezov befriended Vladimir Putin when both were stationed in East Germany in the 1980s. Chemezov enriched himself when Putin became President of Russia. In 2007, Putin appointed him as CEO of Rostec.

The Pandora Papers leaks revealed that Chemezov and his family maintained a large network of offshore wealth, including a $600 million superyacht.

Biography
Chemezov was born on 20 August 1952 in the city of Cheremkhovo in Irkutsk Oblast.

Chemezov graduated with honours from Irkutsk Institute of National Economy (presently Baikal State University of Economics and Law) in 1975 and then completed his postgraduate education at the Military Academy of the General Staff of the Armed Forces of Russia. Chemezov has a doctorate in economics and is also a professor and full member of the Military Academy.

At the Irkutsk Scientific and Research Institute of Rare and Nonferrous Metals, Chemezov provided economic assessment of deposits as an engineer, a research associate, and chief laboratory assistant for six months from 15 October 1975 to 28 April 1976 while he was waiting for his paperwork to process to enter the ranks of the KGB.

East Germany and Putin
From 1980 to 1988 as KGB, he worked at "Luch" Research-Industrial Association which was the KGB surveillance operation gathering scientific and technical intelligence in the communist controlled German Democratic Republic (GDR). From 1983 to 1988, Chemezov served as the head of the Luch Association representative office in East Germany, where he met Vladimir Putin and Nikolay Tokarev. Tokarev, Chemezov and Putin worked for their KGB boss Lazar Matveev while in East Germany and both Chemezov and Putin lived in the same block of flats in Dresden. There they became friends.

From 1988 to 1996, Chemezov, as the KGB controller with the 3rd department of the 11th department of the 5th department of the KGB, was deputy CEO of the "Sovintersport" Foreign Trade Association under the leadership of Viktor Galaev. Sovintersport, which held a monopoly on Soviet sports with the West, is a portmanteau of Soviet, International, Export, and Sport formed by Putin and Chemezov.

Kremlin aide to Putin
From 1996 to 1999, he was chairman of the Department for Foreign Economic Relations within the Office for Presidential Affairs, serving under Putin. Later he transitioned to the position of chairman of the Department for Foreign Economic Relations of the Presidential Administration of Russia. During this time and although both Ukraine and Georgia objected, Chemezov was pivotal in securing for Russia, Russia's correct share from the former USSR's state property, state archives and state debts.

Head of Promexport and Rosboronexport
From September 1999 to November 2000, Chemezov served as CEO of Promexport. In August 2000, he became a member of the Presidential Committee on Military and Engineering Cooperation between Russia and Foreign Countries. From November 2000 to April 2004, Chemezov served as first deputy CEO of Rosoboronexport and then as its CEO from 2004 to 2007. After Rosoboronexport obtained an 66% stake in VSMPO-Avisma in October 2006, Sergey Chemezov became chairman of VSMPO-AVISMA in November 2006.

CEO of Rostec 
On 26 November 2007, Putin appointed by decree Chemezov as CEO of Russian Technologies Corporation, which was renamed Rostec in late 2012.

At the 6th United Russia party convention held on 2 December 2006, Chemezov was elected to the party's Supreme Council. At the 7th party convention on 26 May 2012, Chemezov was reelected.

In 2011, Chemezov, Makarov, and Alexei Miller, chairman of Gazprom, were the supervisory board of Team Katyusha, which was formed in 2008, and, along with Novikombank and Transneft, their companies, Rostec, ITERA, and Gazprom, respectively, were the major sponsors of Katyusha. During this time, Chemezov was involved with Igor Makarov in forming the main subsidiary of the ITERA Group, the Itera Oil and Gas Company, founded in 1992 with headquarters in Jacksonville, Florida and originally owned by Chemezov's wife Iganatova.

On 28 April 2014, he was barred by the Obama administration from entering the United States due to the Annexation of Crimea by the Russian Federation.

On 12 September 2014 as part of a much wider expansion of its programme, Chemezov was sanctioned by the European Union over the Russia-Ukraine conflict.

On 12 September Chemerov was mentioned in a communiqué of the US Treasury because the firm he directs was subjected to sanctions as part of a sweeping ban on the Russian defence sector.

The joint September 2014 sanctions packages had been agreed in principle at the 2014 NATO Wales summit.

Through Serguei Adoniev's charitable contributions, Chemezov had become an influence in the Novaya Gazeta press since 2014.

In February 2019, the Alexei Navalny linked Anti-Corruption Foundation discovered Chemezov's wife's Ekaterina Ignatova's apartment in the building of the Moskva Hotel with a market value of about 5 billion rubles.

On 3 March 2022, the United States imposed visa restrictions and froze assets of Chemezov, his wife, sons, stepdaughter due to the 2022 Russian invasion of Ukraine.

On 15 March 2022, Spain temporarily seized Chemzov's $140m yacht 'Valerie' in Barcelona because of the 2022 Russian invasion of Ukraine.

Offices
Chemezov has served as a member of the Board of Directors for:
United Aircraft Corporation JSC (since 2006)
United Shipbuilding Corporation JSC (since 2007)
Rusnano Corporation (since 2011)
MMC Norilsk Nickel (March 2013) 
Aeroflot Russian Airlines (since 2011) 
Rosneft JSC (as Deputy Chairman of the Board of Directors since June 2013)

Chemezov has served as chairman of the Board of Directors for:
United Industrial Corporation Oboronprom
VSMPO-AVISMA (since 2006)
ОАО «KAMAZ»
AvtoVAZ
Novikombank
National Information and Settlement Systems LLC (since 2012)
Rosoboronexport (since 2011; in August 2013 Chemezov was reelected for a third time)

Academic activity, social activism and patronage
Head of the Department of Military and Engineering Cooperation for the Scientific, Research and Educational Center of the Military Academy
Head of the Department of Military and Engineering Cooperation and High-Tech at MGIMO
Chairman of the Union of Mechanical Engineers, a public organization (since April 2007)
President of the Russian Industrial Association of Employers in Mechanical Engineering (since April 2007)
Chairman of the Supervisory Board of Kalashikov Military and Sport Association, an interregional public organization (since April 2010)
Chairman of the Supervisory Board of the Foundation for the Support and Development of Physical Culture and Sport in the Russian Federation (Sport Foundation)  (since 2005)
Chairman of the Supervisory Board of the Russian Cycling Federation (since 2007)
Chairman of the Supervisory Board of Plekhanov Russian University of Economics
Chairman of the Supervisory Board of Gorchakov Public Diplomacy Foundation

Family
Chemezov married his first wife Lyuba when he was 18 years old.

Chemezov is married to Yekaterina Ignatova, who is a trained planning engineer. She is a co-founder and seventy percent stockholder of Kate LLC, a company that develops and manufactures automatic gearboxes. Ignatova is also the majority shareholder (along with Gor Nahapetyan, the managing director of Troika Dialog) of Étage, a chain of nineteen restaurants in Moscow. She has an apartment at 28 on Povarskaya Street in Moscow.

Chemezov has four children.

According to information accessed in May 2009, Chemezov's eldest son Stanislav (born in 1973) has been working for the company Itera. He is a thirty percent shareholder of Medfarmtekhologia, a member of the board of directors of AvtoVAZEnergo, and chairman of the board of directors of Interbusinessgroup, which holds via structural companies such commercial organizations as Independent Insurance Group LLC, Oborontsement JSC, and Oborontsement-energo LLC. Since 2003, Stanislav Chemezov has been the co-owner (together with Vladimir Artyakov's son, Dmitri) of the Meridian hotel facilities in Gelendzhik. Stanislav Chemezov is the only founder of Interbusinessgroup LLC which has the shares in several construction companies, Russian Industrial Nanotechnologies, I.A.D. business industry and shares in Natural and Organic Products LLC which is one of several companies clustered around Andrey Dolzhich's Virgin Islands firm Natural and Organic Products, Inc that sells soil improvers to Persian Gulf countries including the soil near Bahrain's Royal Palace which now have palm trees growing in soil improvers from Dolzhich's firm.

According to other information accessed in May 2009, Chemezov's second son was studying in a medical institute. His youngest son Sergey was in primary school and his daughter was a graduate student at MGIMO University.

Awards
Order For Merit to the Fatherland of the 2nd class (2012)
Order For Merit to the Fatherland of the 3rd class (20 August 2007) for military and engineering cooperation with foreign countries
Order For Merit to the Fatherland of the 4th class
Order of Friendship (2009)
National Order of the Legion of Honour (France, March 2010) for contributing to the cooperation between France and Russia in high-tech manufacturing
Order of Saint Righteous Grand Duke Dmitry Donskoy (Russian Orthodox Church)
Order of Holy Prince Daniel of Moscow (Russian Orthodox Church)
Order of Saint Seraphim of Sarov of the 2nd class (Russian Orthodox Church)
Russian Government Award in science and engineering for 2004
Person of the Year in 2004 in the area of Defense Industry Complex
Leader of the Russian Economy in 2004, awarded by the International Forum "World Experience and Russian Economy"
Suvorov Prize awarded by the Military Academy
On 21 April 2011, Chemezov was granted the status of an Honoured Resident of the city of Irkutsk for prominent achievements in the area of social, economic and cultural development of the city of Irkutsk

Notes

References

1952 births
Living people
People from Cheremkhovo, Irkutsk Oblast
KGB officers
Russian businesspeople
Russian politicians
Full Cavaliers of the Order "For Merit to the Fatherland"
Recipients of the Order of Honour (Russia)
Chevaliers of the Légion d'honneur
Rostec
Heroes of the Russian Federation
Russian individuals subject to the U.S. Department of the Treasury sanctions
Russian individuals subject to European Union sanctions